Playa Parguito (Parguito Beach) it is situated in the Northeast end of Isla Margarita. The beach is approximately 1000 m long and about 20 m wide. The waters tend to be more oceanic at Playa Parguito which has made it a perfect place for surfing.

Playa Parguito does not offer as many restaurants and other conveniences than Playa El Agua but it is still well liked by people that seek more privacy among the Isla Margarita beaches.

External links 

 Beaches of Margarita Island

Beaches of Venezuela
Margarita Island
Geography of Nueva Esparta
Tourist attractions in Nueva Esparta